The CIBER Field at the University of Denver Soccer Stadium, or simply Denver Soccer Stadium, is a soccer-specific stadium located in Denver, Colorado.  It is home to the Denver Pioneers soccer teams of the University of Denver, Colorado Rapids 2 of the MLS Next Pro and from June 2016 also the home of PRO Rugby team, Denver Stampede.

The facility opened in 2009, and seats 2,000 people. The stadium has hosted Pioneers women's soccer NCAA tournament games, and Pioneers men's soccer NCAA tournament games.

See also
 Sports in Denver

References

External links
 Denver Soccer Stadium

+
College soccer venues in the United States
Rugby union stadiums in Denver
Soccer venues in Colorado
Sports venues in Denver
2009 establishments in Colorado
Sports venues completed in 2009